Gennady Viktorovich Khazanov (born 1 December 1945) is a Russian stand-up comedian and part-time actor. His work includes parodies of Russian and Soviet politicians, and mockery of various sub-cultural groups in modern Russia. After graduating from the Moscow Circus School in 1969, Khazanov worked as a master of ceremonies in Leonid Utyosov Orchestra. He began his solo career in 1973 at Moscontsert, a Moscow state concert organization. He gained early success with monologues of a culinary school student written by Lion Izmailov and Iurii Volovich, and of a brave parrot who cannot stop telling the truth written by Arkady Khait. In 1997, he became artistic director of the Moscow Variety Theatre. In 1999, he was president of the Security Foundation of the Russian Jewish Community, which was set up to coordinate action against antisemitism in Moscow.

He is an acquaintance of Russian President Vladimir Putin. In March 2014, he signed a letter in support of Putin's position on Russia's military intervention in Ukraine.

References

External links
 

1945 births
Living people
Activists against antisemitism
Jewish Russian comedians
Male actors from Moscow
People's Artists of Russia
Russian male film actors
Russian male television actors
Russian satirists
Russian male comedians
Full Cavaliers of the Order "For Merit to the Fatherland"
Russian humorists
Russian parodists
Jewish Russian actors
Russian stand-up comedians